Louis Le Duff (born 1945/1946) is a French billionaire businessman, and the founder and CEO of Groupe Le Duff and the Brioche Dorée bakery chain.

Early life
Le Duff went to school at Lycée de la Croix-Rouge, Brest. He earned a bachelor's degree from the École supérieure des sciences commerciales d'Angers (ESSCA), an MBA from the Université de Sherbrooke, Canada, and a PhD in management sciences from the University of Rennes.

Career
He worked as a teacher at the Rouen Business School, and then a lecturer at the University of Rennes 1, Rennes.

Le Duff opened the first branch of Brioche Dorée in Brest in 1976. The chain now has 1,310 locations in 80 countries.

Personal life
Le Duff is married with two children, and lives in Paris.

References

1940s births
French billionaires
French company founders
French chief executives
Université de Sherbrooke alumni
University of Rennes alumni
Academic staff of the University of Rennes
Living people